Helmut Oswald Maucher (9 December 1927 – 5 March 2018) was a German businessman. He served as the CEO of Nestlé from June 1990 to June 1997.  He joined the company at a young age, completing an apprenticeship at the Nestlé SA factory in Eisenharz, Germany just after finishing high school. He served as honorary chairman of Nestlé SA, Vevey, Switzerland, having been elected to that position by the board after relinquishing its chairmanship in May 2000.

Early life
Helmut Maucher was born on 9 December 1927 in Eisenharz (Allgäu), Germany. When he was 19 Nestlé AG bought the milk production company in Eisenharz in the Western Allgau in which he and his father were employed. After finishing his A levels he was then doing a business apprenticeship in the same company. He then changed to Nestlé Frankfurt, where he was studying business administration at Frankfurt University while working and finished his study with a Master in Business/Commerce.

Career
Between 1964 and 1980 he occupied different management positions at Nestlé Frankfurt, in 1975 he became General Director of the Nestlé Group Germany. On 1 October 1980 he was asked to change to Switzerland to become General Director of the whole Nestlé Group and member of the executive committee.

In November 1981 he became delegate of the supervisory administration board of Nestlé AG in Vevey. Between 1990 and 1997 he was both, president and delegate of the supervisory administration board. In this time he expanded the company to the largest food company worldwide with 260,000 employees. After stepping down from his position as delegate in 1997 he continued to be president of the supervisory administration board until 2000 which is when he was given the position of honorary president. He was the first non-Swiss ever to be given such an honour and position in a major Swiss company.

Maucher served on the board of trustees of the Frankfurt Institute for Advanced Studies.

Controversy
In a 1997 interview, Maucher stated: "There is a certain percentage of prosperity waste in our society; people who are either unmotivated, semi-invalid, tired or who just take advantage of the system." Maucher was alluding to the highly developed German welfare system, which in his opinion removed the necessity to take an employment. He was subsequently criticized for the usage of the term "waste" as a description for human beings, which culminated in Wohlstandsmüll having been chosen as the German Un-Word of the Year 1997 by a jury of linguistic scholars.

Honours and distinctions
 Gold Medal - Fortune Magazine, 1984
 Grand Merit Cross of the Federal Republic of Germany (Grosses Verdienstkreuz) - 1988
 Doctor honoris causa, University of Guadalajara, Mexico- June 1989
 Order of the Aztec Eagle - Mexico, April 1993
 Grand Gold Medal with Star for Services to the Republic of Austria - August 1993
 Leadership Award for Corporate Statesmanship, International Institute for Management Development (IMD) – October 1993
 IMD, Maucher Nestlé Chair, November 1993
 Appeal of Conscience Foundation Award, New York – October 1995
 INTERNORGA prize, Hamburg - March 1996
 Doctor honoris causa, European Business School Oestrich Winkel – Feb 1997
 Business Hall of Fame, Manager Magazine - May 1997
 Grand Cross of Merit with Star of the Federal Republic of Germany - September 1997
 Order of Merit of Baden-Württemberg - 1998
 Doctor honoris causa, University of California - March 1998
 Doctor honoris causa, Technical University Munich – March 1998
 Scopus Award, Hebrew University of Jerusalem – May 1998
 Austrian Cross of Honour for Science and Art, 1st class – August 1999
 Dr. Jelle Zijlstra Award, Swiss Chamber of Commerce in The Netherlands – January 2018

Death
Maucher died in his home in Bad Homburg, Germany on March 5, 2018.

Bibliography
 La stratégie Nestlé, French translation by Monique Thiollet, Maxima Ed., Paris, 1995,

References

External links
German
 Literature of and about Helmut Maucher (http:/d-nb.info/gnd/11906412x) in the catalogue of German National Library
 Marc Brost and Arne Storn "one needs backbone" – interview in Die Zeit Nr.49 on 01.12.2005

1927 births
2018 deaths
Chairmen of Nestlé
Businesspeople from Baden-Württemberg
Knights Commander of the Order of Merit of the Federal Republic of Germany
Recipients of the Grand Decoration with Star for Services to the Republic of Austria
Recipients of the Order of Merit of Baden-Württemberg
Recipients of the Austrian Cross of Honour for Science and Art, 1st class